The Battle of Bloody Creek was fought on December 8, 1757, during the French and Indian War.  An Acadian and Mi'kmaq militia defeated a detachment of British soldiers of the 43rd Regiment at Bloody Creek (formerly René Forêt River), which empties into the Annapolis River at present day Carleton Corner, Nova Scotia, Canada. The battle occurred at the same site as a battle in 1711 during Queen Anne's War.

Prelude

Following the French defeat at the Battle of Fort Beauséjour and the start of the Great Expulsion in 1755, many Acadians formed guerrilla bands in the forests, often linking up with their historic Mi'kmaq allies. These bands operated throughout Nova Scotia until the fall of New France, the most famous guerrilla being Joseph Broussard, also known as Beausoleil. Despite controlling many strong points like Halifax, Annapolis Royal and Fort Beausejour, the British were unable to completely pacify the region.

On December 6, a work party from the 43rd Foot, which garrisoned Annapolis Royal, was cutting firewood near the site of the first battle in 1711 when they were ambushed by an Acadian and Mi'kmaq force. One man was killed and another seven were taken captive. In response, a detachment of 130 men under Captain Peter Pigou was dispatched to recover the prisoners.

Battle

Led by Acadian Guillaume Jeanson, a group of Mi'kmaq and Acadians attacked the British force.  Marching on foot along the south shore of the Annapolis River, the British force was exposed to wet and cold before giving up their search for the prisoners. They were crossing a bridge on the René Forêt River on the morning of December 8 when the Mi'kmaq and Acadians attacked. The British made a brief stand and suffered a high number of casualties, including Captain Pigou, before retreating back to Annapolis Royal.

Aftermath

Despite their victory, the Mi'kmaq and Acadian guerrillas did not follow it up by attacking Annapolis Royal. There were however many similar bands that continued to harass and ambush British forces in Nova Scotia and assist French regular forces through the end of the war. The René Forêt River was renamed Bloody Creek in commemoration of the battle.

The location of the battle is now a National Historic Site of Canada.

See also 

 Military history of Nova Scotia
Siege of Louisbourg (1758)
Military history of the Mi'kmaq people

References

 
[https://archive.org/details/cihm_12845/page/n169?q=privateer+%22bay+of+fundy%22
Story of Bloody Creek. Stories of the land of Evangeline by Rogers, Grace McLeod, 1891

External links
Parks Canada
Monument to the Battle of Bloody Creek (1757)
Historical records of the Forty-third Regiment, Monmouthshire Light Infantry: with a roll of the officers and their services from the period of embodiment to the close of 1867 by Richard George Augustus Levinge

Military history of Acadia
Military history of New England
Military history of the Thirteen Colonies
Conflicts in New Brunswick
Battles of the French and Indian War
Battles involving Great Britain
Battles involving France
Conflicts in 1757
Battle of Bloody Creek (1757)
Conflicts in Nova Scotia
1757 in the Thirteen Colonies
1757 in Canada
Indigenous conflicts in Canada